Eanmund (c.764–?) was a king of Kent, jointly with or in succession to Sigered of Kent.

Eanmund is known only from an undated confirmation, witnessed by Archbishop Bregowine (761–764), added to a charter of Sigered .

See also
List of monarchs of Kent

External links
 

Kentish monarchs
8th-century English monarchs